Aloÿs Claussmann (5 July 1850 – 7 November 1926) was a French organist, pianist and composer.

Biography
Born in Uffholtz, Haut-Rhin (Alsace), Claussmann was a pupil of organist Eugène Gigout at the École Niedermeyer de Paris, where he obtained first prizes in piano and organ, before winning the Grand Prix of the Ministry of Fine Arts in 1872. The following year, he settled in Clermont-Ferrand, where he was appointed Kapellmeister of the Clermont-Ferrand Cathedral. The new Merklin organ was inaugurated in 1877 by Edmond Lemaigre, the first holder. Claussmann succeeded him in 1888 until his death in 1926.

A virtuoso interpreter, he chose to pursue his entire career in the Puy-de-Dôme area, while a Parisian position would have been readily accessible to him. He also founded the Conservatory of Clermont-Ferrand in 1909, directing it until his death.

Although he wrote many works for piano – he was an excellent pianist – as well as chamber music and vocal music, it is to the organ that he reserved the essential and most characteristic of his production, with about 350 compositions, fully in the post-Romantic music that he celebrated with brilliance but yet with sensitivity. He fulfilled his duties as organist of the cathedral, and assumed the function of director of the Conservatory, but he also performed well-known piano concertos with the orchestra of the city, which he occasionally directed.

The Alsatian origin of Claussmann makes his music a very successful synthesis of French and German schools, in which one certainly can identify César Franck, whose influence is certain, and Robert Schumann, but which possesses an indisputable personality of his own.

His work, together with those of other composers such as Marie-Joseph Erb from Strasbourg, Émile Bourdon in Monaco, Edouard Commette in Lyon, canon Fauchard in Laval, to name but a few, contributed to forge, in a way, the missing link between a recognised and celebrated Parisian organ music and the more discreet but undeniable contribution of the provincial masters to the elaboration of a language that contributed to the reputation of the French organ school.

Works
A total of 544 pieces have been identified: 350 organ pieces, 113 piano pieces, 62 songs (or mélodies), 22 violin or cello pieces. Henry Lemoine was his principal publisher from 1904 to 1924. Most of his organ works are still available.

Discography
 Toccata, 2 Scherzos, Minuetto, Méditation, Fantaisie héroïque, Cavatine de Raff, Antienne, and Mass for organ, by Hervé Désarbre at the historical John Abbey organ of Renaison (Mandala).
 Claussmann, pièces pour orgue, by François Clément on the organ of the city of Clermont-Ferrand (Art & Musique).
 Cortège triomphal by Willibald Guggenmos, on the organ of Wangen im Allgäu, Stadtpfarrkirche St. Martin (Psallitte).
 Pièce pour orgue by André Isoir at Hochfelden (ARDAM).
 Toccata, Op. 64, par Aitor Olea Juaristi, at the organ of Vasconia (Aarus).
 Works for piano: Sonate, Op. 45; Six pièces, Op 60; Caprice, Op. 47, par Stéphane Poyet (piano).

Bibliography 
 P. Balme, "Aloys Claussmann", in Auvergne littéraire et artistique (no. 28, Dec. 1926).
 J. Desaymard, "Aloys Claussmann", in Bulletin historique et scientifique de l'Auvergne (vol. LI, 1931).
 P. Desaymard, "Bibliographie des œuvres d'Aloys Claussmann", in Bulletin historique et scientifique de l'Auvergne (vol. 90, no. 668, January–March 1981).

References

External links
 Claussmann, Aloÿs on IMSLP
 Aloÿs Claussmann
 Aloys Claussmann : œuvres pour piano by Claudine Simon
 Aloÿs Claussmann
 France Orgue Discography by Alain Cartayrade.
 YouTube Cees Kelderman plays the Toccata in A minor Op. 64 for organ by Claussmann.

1850 births
1926 deaths
19th-century classical composers
19th-century French composers
19th-century French male musicians
20th-century classical composers
20th-century French composers
20th-century French male musicians
French classical organists
French male classical composers
French male organists
French Romantic composers
Composers for pipe organ
People from Haut-Rhin
Male classical organists